The Conservatoire national des arts et métiers (abbr. CNAM | English: French National Conservatory of Arts and Crafts) is a French public higher education institution, national research centre and grand établissement as well as grande école of engineering, thus part of the French elite universities league. Headquartered in Paris, it has campuses in every major French city, in overseas France and in every francophone African country, China, Haiti, Germany, and Switzerland. Founded in 1794 by the French bishop Henri Grégoire, CNAM's core mission is dedicated to provide education and conduct research for the promotion of science and industry. With 70,000 students and a budget of €174 million, it is the largest university in Europe in terms of Budget for distance learning and continued education, and in terms of enrolment, slightly ahead of the University of Hagen. CNAM provides certificates, diplomas, Bachelor's degrees, Master's degrees and PhD's in Science, Engineering, Law, Management (AMBA-accredited), Finance, Accountancy, Urban planning and Humanities, all designed to abide by the European Bologna Process, and thus complying with the European Credit Transfer System. It is the only higher education institution in Europe to provide Physics, Chemistry and Life-Science engineer's degrees up to a PhD-level (some of which 100% remotely) via distance learning and via its so-called "hybrid learning" which includes intermittent laboratories classes concentrated during a whole week on-site. The CNAM hosts also a museum dedicated to scientific and industrial inventions: Musée des Arts et Métiers (English: the Industrial Design Museum) which welcomed 250,000 visitors in 2018, and is located on the Parisian campus of the French National Conservatory of Arts and Crafts at 292 rue Saint Martin, in the 3rd arrondissement of Paris, in the historical area of the city named Le Marais.

History 
Founded on 10 October 1794, during the French Revolution, it was then proposed by Abbé Henri Grégoire as a "depository for machines, models, tools, drawings, descriptions and books in all the areas of the arts and trades". The deserted Saint-Martin-des-Champs Priory (and particularly its Gothic refectory by Pierre de Montereau) was selected as the site of collection, which officially opened in 1802.

Originally charged with the collection of inventions, it has since become an educational institution. At the present time, it is known primarily as a grand-école and university for:
  adults seeking engineering (multidisciplinary scientific program) and business degrees, proposing evening classes in a variety of topics ;
 young students enrolling in training diplomas in apprenticeship ;
 international student of bachelors and masters taught in English.

The collection of inventions is now operated by the Musée des Arts et Métiers. The original Foucault pendulum was exhibited as part of the collection, but was moved to the Panthéon in 1995 during museum renovation. It was later reinstalled in the Musée des Arts et Métiers. On 6 April 2010, the cable suspending the original pendulum bob snapped causing irreparable damage to the pendulum and to the marble flooring of the museum.

The novel Foucault's Pendulum written by Umberto Eco deals greatly with this establishment, as the Foucault pendulum hung in the museum plays a great role in the storyline. The novel was published in 1989 prior to the pendulum being moved back to the Panthéon during the museum reconstruction.

On 25 November 1819, at the instigation of Duke Decazes, newly nominated as Minister of the Interior, a three-Chairs higher education is established at the French National Conservatory of Arts and Crafts: Applied Mechanical Engineering vested in Baron Charles Dupin; Applied Chemistry entrusted to Nicolas Clément; and Industrial Economics left with Jean Baptiste Say.

Missions and Values 
The French National Conservatory of Arts and Crafts is infused with the values of the Lumières, as part of the French enlightenment era, of the 18th Century French Humanism, and of the French encyclopedists, whose goal was to provide emancipation via knowledge for everyone; the latter being often followed by most Grande Ecole and Universities in France, along with Universalism and Cartesianism. This background paved the way to nowadays CNAM's values of meritocracy, solidarity and academic excellence.

Under the supervision of the Ministry of Higher Education and as French public institution of higher education, it is assigned three missions:

 Training throughout life (Lifelong learning);
 Technological research and innovation;
 Dissemination of scientific and technical culture.

These missions and values are reflected in CNAM's motto: "Omnes docet ubique", which means: "Teaching to everyone everywhere."

Campuses

Parisian campus 
Out of the 70,000 students enrolled at CNAM (57.7% employees, 24% job seekers, 12% students, 6.3% self-employed), 36% are enrolled at the Parisian campus, 3% in Overseas France, 11% abroad and the rest in metropolitan France, of which 1,592 are enrolled at the Grande Ecole engineer school of CNAM: the EiCNAM. The Parisian campus and headquarters of the French National Conservatory of Arts and Crafts is located in one of the last medieval architectural area of Paris, in the historical district of Le Marais in the 3rd arrondissement of Paris, at the former Benedictine priory of Saint-Martin-des-Champs, which church and core architectural style was inspired by the Basilica of Saint-Denis architecture built a few years earlier.

This large Cluniac monastery founded by King Henry the First of France in 1059–1060 on Merovingian vestige, is still visible today. The former gothic-style refectory hall dated from the 13th century remains until today and was reassigned as the library in the middle of the 19th century by the CNAM's architect: Léon Vaudoyer.

Campuses in the rest of Metropolitan France 
CNAM is based in 160 other French cities. French regional CNAM Centres are independent and autonomous in terms of enrolment and selection of candidates. Half of the regional CNAM centres budget is allocated by the French regional councils. The nearest Frenchregional CNAM should apply in terms of enrolment, in other words, someone living in Marseille should enrol in Marseille and not in Paris, even if his desired curriculum is not available in Marseille. As the vast majority of curricula are taught online, students can attend them from their nearest CNAM regional centre. Shall some specific classes be available only in Paris or at another regionalc centre, the student can attend these courses on-site, shall it be required (for example laboratory sessions in Life Science, Physics or Chemistry). Regional centres providing Engineering diploma via the EiCNAM, the Grande Ecole Engineer School of CNAM are all certified by the French national committee responsible for evaluation and accreditation of higher education institutions for the training of professional engineers in France (in French: Commission des Titres d'Ingénieur, abbr.: CTI). Some CNAM regional centres are hosted by other partner universities, for example the CNAM centre of Aix-en-Provence is located at the campus of the French Grande Ecole engineering and research school: Arts et Métiers ParisTech.

Campuses in overseas France

Campuses abroad 
Africa:
 
 
 
 
 
 
 
 
 
 
 : Network of 7 campus founded since 1971.
 
 
 
 
 
 
 
 
 
 
America:

  (in partnership with the State University of Haiti)

Asia:

 : Dongguan
 Establishment in 2017 of the Franco-Chinese Institute DGUT-CNAM, in partnership with the Dongguan University of Technology (DGUT).
: Wuhan
Founding in 2012 of the Franco-Chinese Institute of Engineering and Management, in cooperation with the Wuhan University.

Europe:

  
 In partnership with the Darmstadt University of Applied Sciences | German: Hochschule Darmstadt)
  / 
 The Lemanic Basin (Geneva Lake Region) CNAM Centre is a border-located and binational public higher education institute recognised by both the Swiss and French higher education systems, via the EduQua Label (The Swiss quality label for further education institutions). Classes are given in Saint-Genis-Pouilly, Annemasse and at the University of Geneva in Accounting, Economics, Engineering, IT, Law, Management and Real Eastate Management.

Faculties and Schools

Faculties 
On 7 July 2016, the CNAM's board of directors enacted a reform via the directory of decisions number 2016-24 AG to 2016–33 AG, which goal was to create 16 national pedagogic teams (French: équipes pédagogiques nationales | abbr.: EPN) in lieu of the School for industrial sciences and technologies (French: écoles Sciences industrielles et technologies de l’information | abbr.: Siti) and the School for Management and Society Management et société (French: école Management et Société | abbr.: MS). Some Pedagogic Teams below are also sometimes Schools per se.  

 EPN 1: Building and energetics
 EPN 2: School for Surveyors, Geometricians-Topographers (Abbreviation of the chool name in French: ESGT)
 EPN 3: Electronics, Electrotechnics, Automation, Measurement
 EPN 4: Mechanical Engineering and Materials Science
 EPN 5: IT
 EPN 6: Mathematics and Statistics
 EPN 7: Chemical, pharmaceutical and Food Industries
 EPN 8: Intechmer (Maritime Transport and Marine Biology)
 EPN 9: Economics, Finance, Insurances, Banking (Efab)
 EPN10: Accounting, Finance Monitoring, Audit (CCA)
 EPN 11: Territories (Geography and Sociology)
 EPN 12: Health and Solidarities
 EPN 13: Labour 
 EPN 14: Law and Real Estate 
 EPN 15: Strategies and Management
 EPN 16: Innovation

Schools and institutes of CNAM
 Ecole Pasteur-Cnam: School specialised in public health
 Ecole Vaucanson: first National Management and Engineering Grande Ecole Higher Education Institution for students coming from vocational baccalaureate curricula.
 EiCnam Ecole d'ingénieur.e: "Ei-" standing for: Ecole d'Ingénieur (in English: Engineering School), Grande Ecole curriculum, which like any other Grande Ecole selects students via a national competitive examination. 
 ENASS: French National School for Insurances
 Enjmin: School specialised in video games and interactive media 
 ESGT: School for surveyor/geometrician-topographer
 ICH: Institute specialised in Law applied to Real Estate
 ICSV: Institute specialing in Sales and Marketing
 FFI: College for Refrigeration, Industrial Cooling and HVAC engineering
 IHIE-SSET: Institute for Hygiene and Food Safety
 IIM: Institute specialised in Management
 Inetop: Institute for the study of Labour, career counselling, personal development, education
 INTD: Institute for Culture, Information, Technology and Society
 Intec: Institute for Economics and Accountancy
 Institute of Technology in Management, IT, Industrial Engineering, Physical Measurement, Material Studies
 ISTNA: Institute for Nutrition and Food Science
 ITIP: Institute for Transport and Ports
The academic staff headcount in 2020 reached 1,670, with 568 professors/researchers and 1,120 academic staff, which are called at CNAM: Biatss (French: bibliothèque, ingénieurs, administratifs, techniciens, social et santé | English: library staff, engineering staff, administrative staff, technical taff, social and health services staff).

Doctoral college, doctoral schools and research centres

Doctoral college and doctoral schools 
The CNAM provides via its doctoral college PhD-curricula via distance-learning (along the job), or on-site. There are 91 PhD candidates enrolled at the EiCNAM Grande Ecole engineering School, and a total of 350 professors-researchers and academic staff for a total of 340 doctoral students from 40 different nationalities enrolled at CNAM worldwide, at which 60 thesis defence/examination take place yearly. The doctoral college of CNAM comprises two doctoral schools:

 a doctoral school specialised in Science and Engineering (French: Sciences des métiers de l’ingénieur.e | abbr.: SMI), in partnership with the French Grande Ecole Arts et métiers (doctoral school code: ED 432),
 and a doctoral school Abbé-Grégoire specialised in Humanities and Arts (ED 546).

Doctoral schools in partnership with other French Universities:

 ED 591 : Physics, engineering sciences and energetics
 ED 532 : Mathematics and informatics
 ED 435 : Agriculture, biology, environment, health
 ED 146 : Sciences, technology, health
 Doctoral College of Paris-Saclay University.

Research centres and research laboratories of CNAM 

 Cedric: Research centre in informatics and communication
 CEET: Research centre for labour and employment 
 CRTD: Research centre for labour and development
 Dicen-IdF: Information system in a digital era
 DynFluid: Laboratory of fluid dynamics
 Eren: Research team in food 
 Esycom: Electronics, communication systems and microsystems
 Foap: Vocational training and professional apprenticeship
 GBCM: Laboratory of genomics, bioinformatics and molecular chemistry
 GeF: Laboratory of geomatics and real estate
 HT2S: History of technosciences in our society
 Lafset: Laboratory for refrigeration, industrial cooling, HVAC engineering, energetic and thermal systems
 LCM: Shared laboratory of metrology (LNE-Cnam) 
 Lifse: Laboratory in fluid engineering and energetic systems
 Lirsa: Interdisciplinary laboratory in the research for action, piloting and decision-making (applied to economics, law, management)
 Lise: Interdisciplinary laboratory for sociology applied to economics
 LMSSC: Laboratory for structural mechanics and coupled systems
 M2N: Mathematical modelling and digitalisation
 MESuRS: Modelling, epidemiology and health risk monitoring
 Pimm: Process and engineering in mechanic and material sciences
 Satie: Applications and systems of communication technologies and energetics
 SD (ESDR3C): Intelligence, security and defence, cyber-threats, crisis

Partner research centres 

 GENIAL: Process engineering, food engineering
 Lusac: University laboratory of applied science in Cherbourg – Brittany (Intechmer)
 Metabiot: use of big data for the safety insurance of animal food (in cooperation with ANSES: the French Agency for Food, Environmental and Occupational Health & Safety)
 SayFood: Paris-Saclay Food and Bioproduct Engineering Research Unit (SayFood), in partnership with AgroParisTech, Inrae
 IAT: Institute in aeronautics and aerodynamics

Curricula 
In 2022, amongst the 4366 curricula in total, the array of the Cnam's academic curricula spans the following:

 949 Diploma registered at the National Directory of Professional Certifications (abbreviated in French: RNCP):  
 626 Bachelor's degrees, Master's degrees and PhDs, all designed to abide by the European Bologna Process, and thus complying with the European Credit Transfer System,
 126 Engineering degrees (Grande Ecole and non-Grande Ecole degrees),
 64 RNCP vocational certificates.

 536 Diploma and certificates not registered at the RNCP:  
 241 CNAM Certificate,
 89 CNAM Diploma.

 2201 courses, as part of a certifying curriculum, of which around 84% are solely taught remotely.  

 657 continuing education course, i.e. perfecting classes resulting in a certification.   
 Other classes.

Notable alumni, faculties, academic staff and donators

Other notable alumni and founding members 

 Alexandre Vandermonde (Founding member). Mathematician. From 1794 on, Vandermonde was a founding member of the French Conservatory of Arts and Crafts, examiner with the École polytechnique, professor at the École Normale Supérieure.
 The secret society of the French Conservatory of Arts and Crafts was coined after him, as a token of his work.
 Alain Wisner (alumnus). French doctor and a founder of the Activity-centered ergonomics but also honorary director of the Ergonomics laboratory of the French Conservatory of Arts and Crafts and President of the Ergonomics Society of French language from 1969 to 1971.
 Alice Saunier-Seïté (faculty), professor at CNAM, member of the Institut de France (Académie des Sciences Morales et Politiques) former French Minister of Universities, first woman to be elected at a research chair of CNAM.
 André Sainte-Laguë (faculty), French mathematician and professor at the CNAM from 1938 until 1950, curator of the Mathematics section at the Palais de la Découverte.
 Benoît Roy (alumnus). Industrialist and politician, he established in 1985 the company Audiolab, specialised in hearing aid, of which he is the CEO since then. He is the honorary president of the French hearing aid association and vice-president of the European hearing aid association. He is member of the RPR, then of the UDF and finally of the Nouveau Centre political parties. He was briefly first French constituency of the Indre-et-Loire department in 2002.
 Christian Hauvette (alumnus). French architect, born in Marseilles, he studied with Jean Prouvé and was awarded the Grand Prix national de l'architecture in 1991, an award presented by the French Culture Ministry for his career in architecture.
 Ferdinand Joseph Arnodin (alumnus). French engineer and industrialist, specialising in cableway transporters, he is regarded as the inventor of the transporter bridge, having been the first to patent the idea in 1887.
 François Joseph Fournier (alumnus). Self-taught Belgian adventurer and entrepreneur who explored Mexico and the island of Porquerolles. He was born into a family of modest means, in Clabecq, Belgium and died on Porquerolles.
 François Gernelle (born 20 December 1944) is a French engineer, computer scientist and entrepreneur famous for inventing the first micro-computer using a micro-processor, the Micral N.
 Jean-Baptiste Le Roy (alumnus). Physicist and Encyclopedist, member of the French Academy.
 Jean Ferrat (alumnus). Singer-songwriter.
 Lucien Bossoutrot (alumnus). French aviator and pilot of the first public aerial transport between Paris and London in 1919, twice world-record in closed-circuit flights (8,805 km in 1931 and 10,601 km in 1932).
 Jean Salençon (academic staff), professor at the Grande Ecole École Polytechnique, President of the French Academy of Sciences and of the Institut de France, founding member of the French Academy of Technologies and member of the steering committee of the CNAM.
 Jean-Jacques Salomon (faculty), student of Raymond Aron, founder and director of the Directorate for Science, Technology and Innovation at the OECD, guest lecturer at the Massachusetts Institute of Technology, professor at CNAM.
 Michel Colomban (alumnus). French aeronautical engineer known for his home-built aircraft. He designed the Colomban Cri-cri in 1973, which follower was the model: Cri-Cri (F-PRCQ) i.e. the first all-electric four-engine aircraft in the world.
 Navi Radjou (alumnus). French-Indian born in French-speaking Puducherry, scholar, innovation and leadership advisor based in the Silicon Valley. He is a Fellow at the Judge Business School at the University of Cambridge and has spoken and written widely on the theme of frugal innovation.
 Sylvie Faucheux (faculty). Economist and Professor / Researcher in the Economics of Sustainability, Sustainable Innovation, Management of Smart Cities, the Economics of Ecodistricts and Green building.
 Stasys Ušinskas (alumnus). Lithuanian artist of multiple creative fields: modern painting, stained glass, scenography, animation, puppetry and decorative glass artworks. He is widely regarded as the "father of Lithuanian stained glass art".
  Terence John Quinn CBE FRS (alumnus) is a British physicist, and emeritus director of the International Bureau of Weights and Measures in Paris, where he was director from 1988 until 2003. He is since 2000 Doctor Honoris Causa at CNAM.
 Pierre Bézier (faculty), former professor at the Cnam, was a French engineer and mathematician, and one of the founders of the fields of solid, geometric and physical modelling as well as in the field of representing curves, especially in computer-aided design and manufacturing systems. As an engineer at Renault, he became a leader in the transformation of design and manufacturing, through mathematics and computing tools, into computer-aided design and three-dimensional modelling. Bézier patented and popularized the Bézier curves and Bézier surfaces that are now used in most computer-aided design and computer graphics systems. 
 André Sainte-Laguë (faculty), was a French mathematician who was a pioneer in the area of graph theory. His research on seat allocation methods (published in 1910) led to one being named after him, the Sainte-Laguë method. Also named after him is the Sainte-Laguë Index for measuring the proportionality of an electoral outcome. He was a lecturer in mathematics at the Cnam.

Traditions 
 Vandermonde : secret society of the French Conservatory of Arts and Crafts, allegedly based on the Skull & Bones model of Yale University.
 At the French Conservatory of Arts and Crafts, students are commonly (and also officially) called "auditeurs", referring to audience/listener (instead of "étudiants", in English: students).
Graduates from the Grande Ecole Engineering School: EiCNAM, receive coloured graduation scarf during the diploma bestowal ceremony, depending on the major they belong to:
  Building and public works Engineering, Energetics Engineering, Nuclear Power Engineering,
  IT Engineering,
  Bioinformatics Engineering, Chemical Engineering, Bio-Engineering, Process Engineering, Risk Management Engineering,
  Automation and Robotics Engineering, Electrical Engineering,
  Electronic Systems Engineering, Electronic Systems, Telecommunication and IT Engineering, Electronic system and railway signalling Engineering,
  Aeronautics and Aerospace Engineering, Rail Operation Engineering, 
  Material Engineering, Mechanical Engineering, Mechatronics Engineering.

Foundation 
In 1973, the Louis-de-Broglie Foundation was created at the French National Conservatory of Arts and Crafts by Nobel Prize Laureate in Physics Louis de Broglie along with Physics Nobel-Prize Laureate Louis Néel, and Fields Medallist René Thom, on the occasion of the fiftieth anniversary of the discovery of matter waves. It is now located at the French Academy of Sciences in Paris.

Affiliations and memberships 
CNAM is a part of HeSAM (French: Hautes Écoles Sorbonne Arts et Métiers University), a cluster for higher education and research as a group of universities and institutions comprising 11 members and 4 associated institutions, totalling 110,000 enrolled students.

The members are:

 École nationale supérieure des arts et métiers (Arts et Métiers)
 French National Conservatory of Arts and Crafts (CNAM)
 Centre des études supérieures industrielles (CESI)
 École Boulle
 École Duperré
 École Estienne
 École nationale supérieure des arts appliqués et des métiers d'art (ENSAAMA)
 École nationale supérieure d'architecture de Paris-La Villette (ENSAPLV)
 École nationale supérieure de création industrielle (ENSCI – Les Ateliers)
 Institut Français de la Mode (IFM)
 Paris School of Business (PSB)

See also 
 Écoles de l'an III scientifiques

Notes

References
 Michel Nusimovici, Les écoles de l'an III, 2010

External links

 Official website (in French)
 Official website (in English)
 Official website CNAM Lebanon (in French)

Engineering universities and colleges in France
Schools in Paris
Buildings and structures in the 3rd arrondissement of Paris
Distance education institutions based in France
Grandes écoles
Grands établissements
1794 establishments in France
Educational institutions established in 1794